Bronington is a village and community in Wrexham County Borough, Wales, forming a large part of the Maelor Saesneg. Within the boundaries of the historic county of Flintshire, the community has an area of 3,482 hectares and a population of 1,228 (2001 Census), increasing to 1,242 at the 2011 Census.

The village church, Holy Trinity, was converted from a former brick tithe barn in 1836. To the north-east of the village is Iscoyd Park, a stately home with surrounding parkland which was built around 1740 and enlarged in the 19th century. South of the village is Fenn's Moss, an area of peat bog stretching over into Shropshire, which was declared a national nature reserve in 1996 because of its importance for wildlife.

Governance
An electoral ward in the same name exists. This ward stretches north-west to Bangor-on-Dee with a total population at the 2011 Census of 3,179.

The community itself is made up of three wards: Bronington, Iscoyd and Tybroughton.

References

Notes

Sources
Davies, John; Jenkins, Nigel; Baines, Menna & Lynch, Peredur I. (2008) The Welsh Academy Encyclopaedia of Wales, University of Wales Press, Cardiff.

External links 

photos of Bronington and surrounding area on geograph

Villages in Wrexham County Borough
Communities in Wrexham County Borough